Wang Xuefeng (born December 1954) is a former Chinese politician who spent his entire career in north China's Hebei province. He was investigated by China's top anti-graft agency in January 2023. Previously he served as vice chairman of Hebei Provincial People's Congress from 2013 to 2018.

Early life and education
Wang was born in Yongnian County (now Yongnian District of Handan), Hebei, in December 1954. He was a worker at Matou Iron Smelting Plant in Handan from January 1971 to September 1974 during the late Cultural Revolution. He joined the Chinese Communist Party (CCP) in March 1973. In September 1974, he entered Hebei Institute of Mining and Metallurgy (now North China University of Science and Technology), where he majored in iron-smelting.

Political career
After graduating in 1977, he continued to work at Matou Iron Smelting Plant as an official.

Wang became an official in the CCP Yongnian County Committee in April 1979, and eventually becoming its deputy party secretary in June 1987.

He was deputy party secretary of Guantao County in December 1992, in addition to serving as magistrate.  

He was party secretary of Handan County in January 1998, and held that office until August 2001.

Wang joined the Hebei Provincial Commission for Discipline Inspection in August 2001, where he was promoted to secretary-general in January 2002 and deputy secretary in January 2004. He also served as director of the Hebei Provincial Supervisory Commission between January 2007 and August 2010.

He was chosen as party secretary of Tangshan in August 2010, concurrently serving as vice chairman of Hebei Provincial People's Congress since January 2013.

Downfall
On 6 January 2023, he was put under investigation for alleged "serious violations of discipline and laws" by the Central Commission for Discipline Inspection (CCDI), the party's internal disciplinary body, and the National Supervisory Commission, the highest anti-corruption agency of China.

References

1954 births
Living people
People from Handan
North China University of Science and Technology alumni
People's Republic of China politicians from Hebei
Chinese Communist Party politicians from Hebei